The 2004 St. George Illawarra Dragons season was the 6th in the joint-venture club's history, and they competed in the 2004 NRL season. Coached by Nathan Brown and captained by Trent Barrett, they finished the 2004 Telstra Premiership 5th (out of 15 teams) at the end of the regular season. The Dragons then reached the first week of the finals when they were knocked out by the Penrith Panthers. This was the result of some major upsets which involved two of the top three ranked teams (Bulldogs and Brisbane Broncos) also losing in the first week of the finals.

Draw and Results

Ladder

Home Ground Attendances

Transfers
Gains:
Losses:

Squad

 (captain)

References

St. George Illawarra Dragons seasons
St. George Illawarra Dragons season